The Syzran Higher Military Aviation School is a military academy of the Russian Air Force, responsible for training airmen of the Russian Armed Forces. It is a branch of the Zhukovsky – Gagarin Air Force Academy.

History 
The school originated from the Saratov Military Aviation School of Pilots (SVAShP), formed in March 1940. In 1941, after the Axis invasion of the Soviet Union, the pilot school was transformed into a glider school. After the war, the school was transferred to Pugachyov in Saratov Oblast and was renamed the Airborne Glider School. In 1952, the school received the name of the 160th Military School of Pilots and from 1953 passed to the development of a fundamentally new aircraft technology - helicopters. Since 1960 the school has been located in Syzran, Samara Oblast, and from 1963 was named Syzran Military Aviation School for pilots. In 1966 the school was transferred to the status of a higher school. In 1998, the school was reorganized into the Syzran Military Aviation Institute. Graduates of the school have taken part in the United Nations peacekeeping operations in Vietnam, Angola, Tajikistan, UNPROFOR in Yugoslavia, UNAMSIL in Sierra Leone, Sudan and other countries.

The school's 109th Training Aviation Regiment at Bezenchuk flying Mil Mi-2 and Mil Mi-8 helicopters was disbanded in 2003.

The school now operates the Mil Mi-2, Mil Mi-8T and Mil Mi-24V, Kazan Ansat, and the Kamov Ka-226T.<

The school's units now include:
 131st Training Aviation Regiment — Saratov-Sokol — Mi-2, Mi-8
 484th Training Helicopter Regiment — Syzran — Mi-24
 626th Training Helicopter Regiment — Pugachyov — Mi-2, Mi-8, Mi-24
 Branch in Kirov, Kirov Oblast

Structure 
Faculty of Aviation
Special Faculty
Officer Courses

Commanders 
The following officers commanded the school:
  (1940–1942)
 Mikhail Odintsov (1942–1946)
  (1947–1953)
 Dmitri Makarov (1953–1958)
  (June 1958 – April 1961)
  (1961–1969)
 Valentin Aleksentsev (1970–1977)
 Aleksey Didyk (1977–1986)
  (1986–1999)
 Alexey Pishenin (1999–2004)
 Viktor Ukolov (2004–2009)
  (2009–2013)
 Alexander Asanov (2013–Present)

Notable graduates 

 Mars Rafikov, Soviet cosmonaut
 Sultan Sosnaliyev, former Minister of Defence of Abkhazia
 Ruslan Polovinko, Ukrainian–Azerbaijani helicopter pilot
 Yevgeny Karlov, Russian-born soldier during the First Nagorno-Karabakh War
 Abdulla Xolmuhamedov, Commander of the Uzbekistan Air and Air Defence Forces
 Ivan Yefimovich Zhukov, pilot, Hero of the Soviet Union

Gallery

References 

Flying training schools of the Soviet Union
Units and formations of the Russian Air Force
Training units and formations of Russia
Education and training establishments of the Soviet Army
Military command schools
Military units and formations established in 1940